Tales from the Netherlands is a double live album by the Canadian progressive rock band Mystery.

Overview
The album was recorded during the tour supporting the album The World is a Game at Cultuurpodium Boerderij in Zoetermeer, Netherlands on May 10, 2013 and was the band's first European concert. The recording is made up of songs from the three albums released during Benoît David's time in the band: Beneath the Veil of Winter's Face, One Among the Living and The World is a Game. It is the last album David recorded with the band before leaving in autumn 2013.

Cover art
The cover art is the creation of Polish photographer Leszek Bujnowski, who also created the cover for The World is a Game and Delusion Rain, and is entitled Lost.

Track listing
Disc one

Disc two

Personnel
Benoît David - lead vocals
Michel St-Père - electric guitar, backing vocals
Benoît Dupuis - keyboards, backing vocals
Sylvain Moineau - electric and acoustic guitars, backing vocals
François Fournier - bass guitar, Moog Taurus, backing vocals
Jean-Sébastien Goyette - drums, backing vocals

Release information
 CD - Unicorn Digital - UNCR-5100 - 2014

References

2014 live albums
Mystery (band) albums